Kilmichael is a town in Montgomery County, Mississippi, United States. Per the 2020 Census, the population was 639.

History
The population in 1900 was 227.  The Bank of Kilmichael was established in 1904.

In 2001, the all-white board of aldermen cancelled town elections after citing a need for more time to implement election changes. Allegedly, the elections were delayed in order to avoid electing black politicians. The Justice Department intervened under the Voting Rights Act and forced a special election, in which Kilmichael elected its first black mayor and three black aldermen.

Geography

Demographics

2020 census

Note: the US Census treats Hispanic/Latino as an ethnic category. This table excludes Latinos from the racial categories and assigns them to a separate category. Hispanics/Latinos can be of any race.

2000 Census
As of the census of 2000, there were 830 people, 314 households, and 233 families residing in the town. The population density was 298.7 people per square mile (115.3/km2). There were 367 housing units at an average density of 132.1 per square mile (51.0/km2). The racial makeup of the town was 53.37% African American, 46.27% White, 0.24% Native American, and 0.12% from two or more races. Hispanic or Latino of any race were 0.96% of the population.

There were 314 households, out of which 30.6% had children under the age of 18 living with them, 46.5% were married couples living together, 23.9% had a female householder with no husband present, and 25.5% were non-families. 23.9% of all households were made up of individuals, and 13.7% had someone living alone who was 65 years of age or older. The average household size was 2.62 and the average family size was 3.09.

In the town, the population was spread out, with 26.6% under the age of 18, 8.7% from 18 to 24, 24.5% from 25 to 44, 23.0% from 45 to 64, and 17.2% who were 65 years of age or older. The median age was 37 years. For every 100 females, there were 80.0 males. For every 100 females age 18 and over, there were 73.0 males.

The median income for a household in the town was $24,712, and the median income for a family was $30,909. Males had a median income of $25,192 versus $18,281 for females. The per capita income for the town was $12,457. About 24.8% of families and 25.3% of the population were below the poverty line, including 34.7% of those under age 18 and 28.4% of those age 65 or over.

Education
Kilmichael is served by the Winona-Montgomery Consolidated School District.  Two schools in Kilmichael (Montgomery County Elementary and Montgomery County High School) closed in 2018.

The Town of Kilmichael was previously served by the Montgomery County School District.  Montgomery County Elementary School, formerly Kilmichael Elementary School, and Montgomery County High School were both located in Kilmichael. At one time Kilmichael Elementary had 1,000 students.

In 1989, Kilmichael High School and Duck Hill High School consolidated into one school.  In 1990, the name was changed to Montgomery County High School. Circa 2001 Kilmichael Elementary had 366 students.  In 2004, Kilmichael Elementary and Duck Hill Elementary consolidated to form Montgomery County Elementary School. Effective July 1, 2018 the Montgomery County and Winona Separate School District consolidated into the Winona-Montgomery district. The initial plan is to have one elementary and one high school in Winona, just 11 miles west of Kilmichael.

Notable people
Grace Hightower - philanthropist, singer, actress and socialite.
B.B. King - blues guitarist; reared in Kilmichael.
Topher - rapper, songwriter and conservative commentator.

See also

References

Towns in Montgomery County, Mississippi
Towns in Mississippi